This is a list of all published and upcoming books in the series written by 'Daisy Meadows', including the Rainbow Magic series. Over 200 have been published since 2003.

Rainbow Magic

Main series

Special Edition Fairies ('3 books in 1' edition)

One-offs

Early reader books
Also published were Early Reader versions of the main series intended for younger audiences.

Companion books

Activity books
Fairy Annuals
Fairy Sticker Activity
Fairy Fashion Doodle Book
1001 Fairy Stickers
Fairy Holiday Doodle Book
101 things to Make and Do
Magical Fairy Make and Bake
Fairy Dress-Up Sticker Fun
•Fairy Birthday Doodle Book
•Magical Fairy Make and Heal

Factfile books
The Complete Book of Fairies
My Big Book of Fairies
My A to Z of Fairies
•My Basis of Fairies 

Additionally, there are annuals released yearly, that were discontinued in 2016.

Magic Animal Friends
Magic Animal Friends is another book series written under the Daisy Meadows pen name. Its first series was released on 3 July 2014 with four books and there have been no more since 3 May 2018. The list is as follows:

Main series

Specials

Early reader books

Companion books

Unicorn Magic
Unicorn Magic was also written under the pen name Daisy Meadows. Its first series began on 3 June 2019 and there have been no more since 11 November 2021. Each series has four books, with two releasing on the same day and the other two releasing on a later date. The list is as follows:

Main series

Specials

Pixie Magic
Pixie Magic was also written under the pen name Daisy Meadows. Its first series began on 2 March 2023. The list is as follows:

Main series

References

Lists of fantasy books